Euseius victoriensis is a species of mite in the family Phytoseiidae.

References

victoriensis
Articles created by Qbugbot
Animals described in 1954